The Vanier Cup is the championship of Canadian university football. It is organized by U Sports football and is currently played between the winners of the Uteck Bowl and the Mitchell Bowl. It is named after Georges Vanier, the former governor general of Canada and was first awarded in 1965 to the winner of an invitational event contested between two teams that were selected by a panel. In 1967, the trophy was declared the official "CIAU National Football Championship" and a playoff system was instituted. From its creation until 1982, it was known as the Canadian College Bowl. The game typically occurs in late November, although it is occasionally played in December.

The Laval Rouge et Or have won the most Vanier Cups (11), while the Western Mustangs have the most appearances (15). Eighteen teams have won the Vanier Cup, while three others have played for the championship but never won. There are six active teams that have never appeared in the championship game. The most recent game, the 57th Vanier Cup, was played on November 26, 2022, at London, Ontario. In this game, the Laval Rouge et Or defeated the Saskatchewan Huskies 30–24 to win their 11th championship.

History
The Vanier Cup was created in 1965 as the championship trophy of the Canadian College Bowl. For the first two years of competition, the Canadian College Bowl was an invitational event, with a national panel selecting two teams to play, similar to other U.S. collegiate bowl games. In 1967, the Canadian College Bowl was declared the national football championship of the Canadian Intercollegiate Athletic Union, later Canadian Interuniversity Sport (CIS) and now U Sports, with a playoff system determining the two participants.

The Vanier Cup was played in Toronto, Ontario, from its inception in 1965 through 2003. However, after the CIS opened the game to host conference bids in 2001, the possibility arose to have games held outside Toronto. As of 2016, 41 of the 52 Vanier Cups have been played in Toronto, five in Quebec City, four in Hamilton, one in Saskatoon, one in Vancouver and one in Montreal. No games have been staged in the Atlantic region.  Four times, the game has been played in the same city and during the same weekend as the Grey Cup: 1973, 2007 and 2012 in Toronto and in 2011 in Vancouver at BC Place Stadium.

The Vanier Cup is played between the winners of the Uteck Bowl (formerly Atlantic Bowl) and the Mitchell Bowl (formerly the Churchill Bowl). The Uteck and Mitchell Bowls, in turn, are contested by the Loney Bowl (AUS), Hardy Cup (Canada West), Dunsmore Cup (RSEQ), and Yates Cup (OUA) champions.

On June 8, 2020, U Sports announced that all fall athletics championships for the 2020–21 season had been cancelled due to the COVID-19 pandemic.

Awards
The Vanier Cup's most valuable player is awarded the Ted Morris Memorial Trophy. It was first awarded at the first championship in 1965 and named in honour of Teddy Morris, who died the same year. Morris, a Hall of Fame former Toronto Argonauts player and coach, was an organizer of the first bowl and champion for developing Canadian players.

The Bruce Coulter Award was first awarded in 1992 and is dependent on what position the winner of the Ted Morris Trophy played. If the winner is from the offence, then the Bruce Coulter Award winner will be the most outstanding defensive player or vice versa. It was named after Bruce Coulter, long-time Head Coach of the Bishop's Gaiters and former offensive and defensive player with the Montreal Alouettes in the 1950s. Coulter was inducted as a builder in the Canadian Football Hall of Fame in 1997.

Broadcasting

The Vanier Cup final game is regularly broadcast nationally. From 1965 though 1976 it was broadcast on CBC Television, from 1977 through 1988 it was broadcast on the CTV Television Network. In 1989, TSN acquired rights to the game, lasting through to 2012 (besides a one-year stint on The Score in 2008).

In November 2010, the rights to the Vanier Cup were purchased by sports marketing company MRX. The 2011 game was held in Vancouver, on the same weekend as the 99th Grey Cup and for the first time it was fully integrated into the Grey Cup Festival as a festival event.

In 2012, the 48th Vanier Cup, played between Laval and McMaster at Rogers Centre in Toronto became both the most attended and most watched Vanier Cup ever. Held the same weekend and in the same city as the 100th Grey Cup, the game was attended by 37,098. The previous record was set in 1989 at the 25th Vanier Cup, when 32,847 watched the game between Western and Saskatchewan that was also played at SkyDome (now Rogers Centre). The game, broadcast on TSN and RDS was watched by 910,000.

In February 2013, the CIS terminated the option years on their agreement with MRX opting for an open bid process for the hosting of the game. Laval University, in Quebec City, was the only bidder for the game and won the right to host the 49th Vanier Cup. In May, CIS terminated its agreement with TSN, and entered into a six-year deal with Sportsnet to broadcast its championships, including the Vanier Cup.

The switch in venues, the decoupling of the Vanier Cup from Grey Cup week, and the change in broadcaster, led to a precipitous drop in attendance and viewership. A total of 301,000 viewers watched Laval defeat the Calgary Dinos 25-14 Saturday, November 23, 2013, which was a decline of 64 per cent from the previous year. A standing room crowd of 18,543 were on hand at the Telus Stadium which was a decline of 50 per cent from the previous year in Toronto (although a sellout in that venue). In 2019, after several more years of declines, the Vanier Cup returned to CBC.

Championships

Key
  Number of times that team has won the Vanier Cup.
Note: All Ted Morris Trophy and Bruce Coulter Award winners played for the winning team, unless otherwise noted.

A. Bob McGregor, Ted Morris Trophy winner in 1971, played for the runner-up team.
B. In the 1972 game, the Vanier Cup Committee and Canadian Interuniversity Athletic Union officials decided to crown co-winners from the same school.
C. Rob Schrauth, Bruce Coulter Award winner in 1993, played for the runner-up team.
D. Brent Schneider, Ted Morris Trophy winner in 1994, played for the runner-up team.

Vanier Cup appearances

E. The Wilfrid Laurier record includes three games played as Waterloo Lutheran.

Six active teams have never played for the Vanier Cup: Bishop's Gaiters (AUS/RSEQ/OQIFC), Carleton Ravens (OUA), Sherbrooke Vert-et-Or (RSEQ), Waterloo Warriors (OUA), Windsor Lancers (OUA), and York Lions/Yeomen (OUA).

See also

 List of awards presented by the Governor General of Canada
 List of awards named after Governors General of Canada

References

General
 
 
 
Specific

External links 

 Official Vanier Cup website
 2009 Vanier Cup Media Kit

 
Recurring sporting events established in 1965
1965 establishments in Canada
U Sports trophies